Caricatures is the first album by the French progressive rock band Ange, released in 1972.

Track listing
"Biafra 80 (Introduction)"  – 3:50
"Tels quels"  – 6:55
"Dignité"  – 9:35
"Le soir du diable"  – 4:32
"Caricatures"  – 12:46
"Biafra 80 (Final)"  – 2:22

Personnel
Jean Michel Brezovar – solo guitar, acoustic guitar, flute, vocals
Christian Décamps – Hammond organ, piano, lead vocals
Francis Décamps – keyboards, vocals
Daniel Haas – bass, guitar
Gerald Jelsch – drums

Release history

References

1972 debut albums
Ange albums